Podosinovets is a rural locality (a settlement) in Krasnopolyanskoye Rural Settlement, Nikolsky District, Vologda Oblast, Russia. The population was 15 as of 2010.

Geography 
Podosinovets is located 8 km southwest of Nikolsk (the district's administrative centre) by road. Svetly Klyuch is the nearest rural locality.

References 

Rural localities in Nikolsky District, Vologda Oblast